Dictionary of Occult, Hermetic and Alchemical Sigils, written by  in 1981, is a reference, guide, and source book, which examines variations in, developments of, & meanings of sigils & symbols, used by occultists, alchemists, astrologers, hermeticists, magicians & others, over the past millennium. Contains several thousand sigils from the hermetic, astrological and alchemical tradition.  These are classified alphabetically. Gettings also included a useful graphic index which links their graphic form with a related verbal meaning and this would make it much easier to use these sigils meaningfully in ceremonies, etc.

References

Occult books
Occult texts
Alchemical documents
Astrological texts
Hermeticism
Magical terminology